The Cathedral of St. Mark  also called Korčula Cathedral, is the Roman Catholic cathedral of Korčula, Croatia. It occupies an elevated position in the town centre.

Architecture and furnishings
The cathedral was built by local masters from the fifteenth century to the mid-sixteenth century. In 1557, an organ was placed in the cathedral. Tintoretto painted the altarpiece. The portal is the work of Bonino da Milano. A new organ was built in 1787 by Vinko Klisevic. In modern times, a bronze statue of Jesus Christ, the work of Croatian sculptor Frano Kršinić, was added to the baptistery.

See also
Roman Catholic Diocese of Dubrovnik
Roman Catholicism in Croatia

References

Roman Catholic cathedrals in Croatia
Korčula
Buildings and structures in Dubrovnik-Neretva County